The 1981–82 Cheshire County Football League was the 58th and last in the history of the Cheshire County League, a football competition in England, most clubs are transferred
to the newly formed North West Counties Football League. Teams were divided into two divisions.

Division One

The division featured two new teams, both promoted from last season's Division Two:
 Accrington Stanley  (1st)
 Glossop (2nd)

League table

Division Two

The division featured three new teams:
 Two relegated from last seasons Division One:
 Kirkby Town (19th)
 New Mills (20th)
 One joined the division:
 Ellesmere Port & Neston

League table

References

1981–82 in English football leagues
Cheshire County League